James Frederick Blake (April 14, 1912 – March 21, 2002) was an American bus driver in Montgomery, Alabama, whom Rosa Parks defied in 1955, prompting the Montgomery bus boycott.

Early life
Born on April 14, 1912, Blake was drafted into the Army on December 23, 1943, at Fort McClellan in Anniston, Alabama.

He worked as a bus driver for Montgomery City Bus Lines until 1974.  After he retired, he became a member of the Morningview Baptist Church.

Arrest of Rosa Parks

On June 15, 1955, while driving a bus in Montgomery, Blake tried to run off the road a car driven by a black woman, Lucille Times.  When she stopped to run an errand in Montgomery, he parked his bus across the street and proceeded to yell at her and they exchanged epithets and started fighting.  Furious, Ms. Times contacted the National Association for the Advancement of Colored People (NAACP) and the bus company but received no response. She also sent unpublished letters to newspapers in Montgomery and Atlanta.  For the next six months, Ms. Times retaliated against the bus company by driving by bus stops to offer free rides to waiting black passengers.  In effect, Times began a boycott of the bus company six months before the NAACP and Rosa Parks began the better-known boycott of that company.

In 1955, Montgomery's black leaders were preparing to make a legal case against racial discrimination on the city bus system. Rosa Parks was selected to be the central figure in a challenge to the Jim Crow laws which supported segregation.

Years before, in 1943, Parks had boarded a bus driven by Blake. She entered the front door of that bus and paid her fare; as she continued on to take a seat, Blake told her to disembark and enter the bus again from the back door, a rule imposed by some drivers. But when she got off to re-enter through the back, Blake drove the bus away. Parks vowed to herself she would never ride with Blake again.

Blake and Parks encountered each other again on December 1, 1955 (Parks having forgotten to check who was driving the bus on this occasion), when Blake ordered Parks and three other black people to move to the back of his Cleveland Avenue bus (number 2857) in order to make room for a white passenger. By Parks' account, Blake said, "Y'all better make it light on yourselves and let me have those seats." When she refused, Blake first contacted the bus company and called his boss remarking, "I called the company first, just like I was supposed to do," Blake recalled in a later interview with the Washington Post. "I got my supervisor on the line. He said, 'Did you warn her, Jim?' I said, 'I warned her.' And he said, and I remember it just like I'm standing here, 'Well then, Jim, you do it, you got to exercise your powers and put her off, hear?' And that's just what I did."

Parks, after being arrested, was fined $10 plus $4 in court fees (a total  dollars). Later, Blake contacted the police and signed the warrant for her arrest (Chapter 6, Section 11, of the city code gave drivers police powers for the racial assignment of seats.) The arrest sparked the Montgomery bus boycott and led to Browder v. Gayle, the 1956 court case on the basis of which a United States District Court abolished segregation in transportation for the jurisdiction in which Montgomery, Alabama, is located.

Commenting on the event afterwards, Blake stated, "I wasn't trying to do anything to that Parks woman except do my job. She was in violation of the city codes, so what was I supposed to do? That damn bus was full and she wouldn't move back. I had my orders. I had police powers—any driver for the city did. So the bus filled up and a white man got on, and she had his seat and I told her to move back, and she wouldn't do it."

Death
Blake continued working at the bus company (the Montgomery City Lines became the Montgomery Area Transit System in 1974) for another 19 years. He died of a heart attack in his Montgomery home in March of 2002, less than a month before his 90th birthday. He and his wife had been married for 68 years.

Rosa Parks was reported to have said in her condolences, "[I'm] sure his family will miss him."

See also
 People of the Montgomery bus boycott

References

1912 births
2002 deaths
Montgomery bus boycott
History of Montgomery, Alabama
Bus drivers